Deshabandu Dr. Themmadurage Pabilis Silva :; (born 24 April 1936) is a Sri Lankan chef and television personality. Considered as an icon in Sri Lankan cuisine, Silva has the honor of taking Sri Lankan Sinhala food to the international arena and his recipes are famous all around the world. Silva started as a coal miner in the hotel, later he became the Chief Chef of the Mount Lavinia Hotel and is currently a member of the Board of Directors.

Personal life
He was born on 24 April 1936 in Gammeddegoda, Rathgama as the second child of the family with five. His love name was Kirimahatthaya. His father Appu Singho was a social worker. His mother Kumarasinghe Podihami also did few works. He went to school only in fourth grade. According to him, he went to the market with his mother and sold vegetables to make a living. Some days he ate rotten pumpkins and lived without anything to eat. Both father and mother have no education. Some days Pabilis went to work at several homes. Went to Pindapatha with the Buddhist Thero. 

He has two brothers and two sisters. He first attended to Rajgama Devapathiraja. He did not have to study there for more than a month and was later admitted to a missionary school in the same area due to onset of World War II. He did not attend the missionary school for more than two years and later attended to Sirisumana Vidyalaya. He was a rebellious boy who had to be constantly punished at school and showed no ability or interest in education by nature.

Even at a young age he had no desire to do a job. Later, at the age of 20, he married girlfriend Wimalawathi Rajakaruna. They went to the same school when they were little. At first there were a few minor issues with their relationship but then there was no reluctance. Finally they married in 1956. The desire to get a job came when he was married and had a child. The couple has three daughters including Nishani Maheshika and two sons. They came to live in Colombo in 1978.

When he was a kid, he used to pull nets. Then he pushed dry carts and as well as a shoplifter, a narrator and an abbot.

Culinary career
In 1952, Pabilis came to Colombo after running away from home. He tried to do one job at a time in Pettah and later tried to make a living by selling things one by one. He also acted a comedy character in a stage play done in the village. On the day of the Great Eclipse on June 20, 1955, he was working at a hotel in the Ibbanwala Junction area. After working at the hotel for a short time, he left for another job and eventually ended up as a tourist dealer in Pettah. However, he had to return to the village because of the 1956 communal riots.

In 1956, Pabilis got a job as a coal miner in kitchen at the Mount Lavinia Hotel through wife's elder brother. The first salary is forty rupees. At the hotel he met a chef named Uncle John. He made a curry dish from temple tree leaves. Seeing this, Pabilis walked all over Sri Lanka and found different types of food resources and culinary methods. As a result, more than 365 vegetables have been found in the country so far by Pabilis Silva. He also found 76 fruits, including carrots, beetroot, kohlrabi, and pepper. He got his first promotion to the position of a third grade chef. After fifteen years, he was the chief chef of Mount Lavinia. He always researched and searched for old food recipes. Later he made new dishes. That's his secret.

Pabilis currently holds two Guinness World Records. That is, the world's largest milk rice and the world's smallest recipe book. The world's largest milk rice made by using 1,000 kilos, is 62 feet long, 5 feet wide and 1.5 inches high. Also the length and breadth of the world's smallest recipe book is 1 cm. It weighs 5 milligrams and is titled "Sri Lankawe Raja Bojana" in Sinhala and English.

The idea of adding Sri Lankan medicinal foods to make a culinary encyclopedia came at his young age. A few of colleagues and Pabilis Silva used to go to other people's estates and pick coconuts and eat them. One day he broke a coconut and took it to the sea and washed it with seawater. It tastes really good and then continued to do so. It was a starting point to try new things. With that idea for more than 40 years ago, Silva published a culinary book Mahasupavanshaya. In the book, 90% of the edible plants in Sri Lanka are published with photos. This includes 56 endemic potato varieties, 76 endemic fruits and 1450 endemic plants. The book is designed to be changed every two years. The book consists of a thousand pages. It was launched on 24 April 2017 at the BMICH.

In May 2016, he was felicitated for 60 years of dedicated service to Mount Lavinia Hotel at the Annual Staff Day.

Beyond culinary
He also involved for a biographical documentary "Supika Siritha" directed by film director Bertram Nihal. Silva was the one who spent the money. Filming was done in Negombo, Chilaw, Pettah and Rathgama.

On 22 March 2017, he was honored with Deshabandu award by president Maithripala Sirisena.

On 23 January 2019, he was invited as the chief resource person for the fourth phase of the Sarthakarthwaye Sewaneli workshop organized by the Career Guidance Unit of the University of Sri Jayewardenepura.

References

External links
 ප්‍රවීණ සූපවේදී පබිලිස් සිල්වා මහතා කෑම රසවත් කරන රහස් 06 ක් මෙන්න
 පණු අමාරු වලට ගුණ දෙන පබිලිස් සිල්වා මහතාගේ රසවත් ගුණවත් ආහාර වට්ටෝරු මෙන්න
 ආචාර්ය පබිලිස් සිල්වාගේ මතක ආවර්ජනය
 පබිලිස් මහතාගේ තුනපහ හදන රහස
 සුජාතා බුදුන්ට පිදූ කිරිබත හදන හැටි පබිලිස් කියයි
 බිස්වාල් පබිලිස් සමග කුස්සියේ වැඩ

1936 births
Sri Lankan chefs
Sri Lankan television chefs
Food writers
21st-century Sri Lankan writers
Living people